Tommaso Marchesi (March 7, 1773 – June 6, 1852) was an Italian composer.

Marchesi was born in Lisbon, but studied music at Bologna, where in 1808 he founded the Accademia dei Filarmonica.

1773 births
1852 deaths
Italian male classical composers
Italian Classical-period composers
Italian Romantic composers
19th-century classical composers
19th-century Italian male musicians